Uromastycinae is a subfamily of reptiles in the family Agamidae.

Genera
The subfamily consists of the following two genera:

References

External links
 
 

Agamidae
Reptile subfamilies
Taxa named by Frederick Vincent Theobald